Don Klosterman may refer to:

 Don Klosterman (American football) (1930–2000), American football executive
 Don Klosterman (soccer), head women's soccer coach at the University of Nebraska at Omaha